The 1932–33 season was the 24th in the history of the Isthmian League, an English football competition.

Dulwich Hamlet were champions, winning their third Isthmian League title.

League table

References

Isthmian League seasons
I